The Mountain Times is a weekly newspaper that serves Boone and other high-country communities in Ashe and Avery counties in western North Carolina, United States.

Founded in 1978, it serves a special niche in the region, covering community news and entertainment happenings. In 2002, it was purchased by a community-focused newspaper organization, Jones Media Inc., of Greeneville, Tennessee.

The Mountain Times publishes every Thursday, with issues available at nearly 250 locations throughout the High Country.

In addition to the regular weekly edition, The Mountain Times also publishes three seasonal publications — Summer Times, Autumn Times and Winter Times, which serve as visitor guides to the High Country.

The Mountain Times was acquired by Adams Publishing Group in 2016.

References

External links
 Jones Media Publications - The Mountain Time's former Parent Company

Weekly newspapers published in North Carolina
Boone, North Carolina